Lucas Bernadou (born 24 September 2000) is a French professional footballer who plays as a midfielder for Eredivisie club FC Emmen.

Career

Paris Saint-Germain
Bernadou is an academy graduate of Paris Saint-Germain. He was a regular for club's reserve team during 2018–19 season. Following closure of the Championnat National 2 reserve team in May 2019, Bernadou was unable to find another club, and chose to stay with PSG despite not being eligible to play for under-19 team. He was not considered by Thomas Tuchel as being part of senior team, either. He played three matches for the club's amateur reserve side in the Championnat National 3 before the competition was terminated due to COVID-19 pandemic.

Emmen
On 22 July 2020, Eredivisie club FC Emmen announced the signing of Bernadou on a two-year deal with option to extend for another season. He made his professional debut on 28 October in a 2–0 KNVB Cup win against FC Eindhoven, and scored his first goal in a 3–2 league loss to Utrecht on 22 December.

Honours
Emmen
Eerste Divisie: 2021–22

References

External links
 
 

2000 births
Living people
French footballers
Association football midfielders
Championnat National 2 players
Championnat National 3 players
Eredivisie players
Paris Saint-Germain F.C. players
FC Emmen players
French expatriate footballers
French expatriate sportspeople in the Netherlands
Expatriate footballers in the Netherlands